is Sachi Tainaka's sixth single and is scheduled for a November 7, 2007 release. Ichibanboshi will be used as the theme song for the film entitled Persona.

The single reached #63 in Japan. The CD's catalog number is GNCX-0011.

Track listing
Lipstick
Ichibanboshi
Lipstick -instrumental-
Ichibanboshi -instrumental-

References

2007 singles
Sachi Tainaka songs